United Nations Security Council resolution 447, adopted on 28 March 1979, after hearing representations from the People's Republic of Angola and the South West Africa People's Organisation (SWAPO), the Council recalled resolutions 387 (1976) and 428 (1978) and condemned South Africa for its continuing raids in direct violation of prior resolutions.

Resolution 447 went on to condemn the suppression of the Namibian people by South Africa, apartheid and the militarisation of South West Africa (Namibia). The Council demanded South Africa respect the territorial integrity of these states, and commended Angola and other front-line states for their support of the Namibian people, asking other states to provide assistance to them.

The resolution ended with a request to the Secretary-General to submit a report by 30 April 1979 on the situation.

The Council adopted Resolution 447 by 12 votes to none; France, the United Kingdom and United States abstained.

See also
 List of United Nations Security Council Resolutions 401 to 500 (1971–1976)
 Namibian War of Independence
 South African Border War
 Apartheid

References
Text of the Resolution at undocs.org

External links
 

 0447
20th century in South Africa
1979 in Africa
 0447
Angola–South Africa relations
March 1979 events